A seiche is a standing wave in an enclosed or partially enclosed body of water. Seiches and seiche-related phenomena have been observed on lakes, reservoirs, swimming pools, bays, harbors, caves and seas. The key requirement for formation of a seiche is that the body of water be at least partially bounded, allowing the formation of the standing wave.

The term was promoted by the Swiss hydrologist François-Alphonse Forel in 1890, who was the first to make scientific observations of the effect in Lake Geneva. The word had apparently long been used in the region to describe oscillations in alpine lakes. According to Wilson (1972), this Swiss French dialect word comes from the Latin word  meaning "dry", i.e., as the water recedes, the beach dries.

Seiches in harbours can be caused by long-period or infragravity waves, which are due to subharmonic nonlinear wave interaction with the wind waves, having periods longer than the accompanying wind-generated waves.

Causes and nature
Seiches are often imperceptible to the naked eye, and observers in boats on the surface may not notice that a seiche is occurring due to the extremely long periods.

The effect is caused by resonances in a body of water that has been disturbed by one or more factors, most often meteorological effects (wind and atmospheric pressure variations), seismic activity, or tsunamis. Gravity always seeks to restore the horizontal surface of a body of liquid water, as this represents the configuration in which the water is in hydrostatic equilibrium.

Vertical harmonic motion results, producing an impulse that travels the length of the basin at a velocity that depends on the depth of the water. The impulse is reflected back from the end of the basin, generating interference. Repeated reflections produce standing waves with one or more nodes, or points, that experience no vertical motion. The frequency of the oscillation is determined by the size of the basin, its depth and contours, and the water temperature.

The longest natural period of a seiche is the period associated with the fundamental resonance for the body of water—corresponding to the longest standing wave.  For a surface seiche in an enclosed rectangular body of water this can be estimated using Merian's formula:

 

where T is the longest natural period, L and h are the length and average depth of the body of water, and g the acceleration of gravity.

Higher-order harmonics are also observed. The period of the second harmonic will be half the natural period, the period of the third harmonic will be a third of the natural period, and so forth.

Occurrence
Seiches have been observed on both lakes and seas. The key requirement is that the body of water be partially constrained to allow formation of standing waves. Regularity of geometry is not required; even harbours with exceedingly irregular shapes are routinely observed to oscillate with very stable frequencies.

Lake seiches
Low rhythmic seiches are almost always present on larger lakes. They are usually unnoticeable among the common wave patterns, except during periods of unusual calm. Harbours, bays, and estuaries are often prone to small seiches with amplitudes of a few centimetres and periods of a few minutes.

The original studies in Lake Geneva by François-Alphonse Forel found the longitudinal period to have a 73-minute cycle, and the transversal seiche to have a period of around 10 minutes. Another lake well known for its regular seiches is New Zealand's Lake Wakatipu, which varies its surface height at Queenstown by 20 centimetres in a 27-minute cycle. Seiches can also form in semi-enclosed seas; the North Sea often experiences a lengthwise seiche with a period of about 36 hours.

The National Weather Service issues low water advisories for portions of the Great Lakes when seiches of 2 feet or greater are likely to occur. Lake Erie is particularly prone to wind-caused seiches because of its shallowness and its elongation on a northeast–southwest axis, which frequently matches the direction of prevailing winds and therefore maximises the fetch of those winds.

The effect is similar to a storm surge like that caused by hurricanes along ocean coasts, but the seiche effect can cause oscillation back and forth across the lake for some time. In 1954, the remnants of Hurricane Hazel piled up water along the northwestern Lake Ontario shoreline near Toronto, causing extensive flooding, and established a seiche that subsequently caused flooding along the south shore.

Lake seiches can occur very quickly: on July 13, 1995, a large seiche on Lake Superior caused the water level to fall and then rise again by three feet (one metre) within fifteen minutes, leaving some boats hanging from the docks on their mooring lines when the water retreated. On Lake Michigan, eight fishermen were swept away from piers at Montrose and North Avenue Beaches and drowned when a  seiche hit the Chicago waterfront on June 26, 1954.

Lakes in seismically active areas, such as Lake Tahoe in California/Nevada, are significantly at risk from seiches.

Earthquake-generated seiches can be observed thousands of miles away from the epicentre of a quake. Swimming pools are especially prone to seiches caused by earthquakes, as the ground tremors often match the resonant frequencies of small bodies of water. The 1994 Northridge earthquake in California caused swimming pools to overflow across southern California. The massive Good Friday earthquake that hit Alaska in 1964 caused seiches in swimming pools as far away as Puerto Rico. The 2004 Indian Ocean earthquake caused seiches in standing water bodies in many Indian states  as well as in Bangladesh, Nepal, and northern Thailand. Seiches were again observed in Uttar Pradesh, Tamil Nadu and West Bengal in India as well as in many locations in Bangladesh during the 2005 Kashmir earthquake.

The 1950 Assam–Tibet earthquake is known to have generated seiches as far away as Norway and southern England. Other earthquakes in the Indian sub-continent known to have generated seiches include the 1803 Kumaon-Barahat, 1819 Allah Bund, 1842 Central Bengal, 1905 Kangra, 1930 Dhubri, 1934 Nepal-Bihar, 2001 Bhuj, 2005 Nias, 2005 Teresa Island earthquakes. The February 27, 2010 Chile earthquake produced a seiche on Lake Pontchartrain, Louisiana, with a height of around 0.5 feet. The 2010 Sierra El Mayor earthquake produced large seiches that quickly became an internet phenomenon.

Seiches up to at least 1.8 m (6 feet) were observed in Sognefjorden, Norway, during the 2011 Tōhoku earthquake in Japan.

Sea and bay seiches
Seiches have been observed in seas such as the Adriatic Sea and the Baltic Sea. This results in the flooding of Venice and Saint Petersburg, respectively, as both cities are constructed on former marshland. In St. Petersburg, seiche-induced flooding is common along the Neva River in the autumn. The seiche is driven by a low-pressure region in the North Atlantic moving onshore, giving rise to cyclonic lows on the Baltic Sea. The low pressure of the cyclone draws greater-than-normal quantities of water into the virtually landlocked Baltic. As the cyclone continues inland, long, low-frequency seiche waves with wavelengths up to several hundred kilometres are established in the Baltic. When the waves reach the narrow and shallow Neva Bay, they become much higher—ultimately flooding the Neva embankments. Similar phenomena are observed at Venice, resulting in the MOSE Project, a system of 79 mobile barriers designed to protect the three entrances to the Venetian Lagoon.

In Japan, seiches have been observed in Nagasaki Bay, most often in the spring. Seiches in Western Kyushu—including Nagasaki Bay—are often induced by a low in the atmospheric pressure passing South of Kyushu island. Seiches in Nagasaki Bay have a period of about 30 to 40 minutes.

On occasion, tsunamis can produce seiches as a result of local geographic peculiarities. For instance, the tsunami that hit Hawaii in 1946 had a fifteen-minute interval between wave fronts. The natural resonant period of Hilo Bay is about thirty minutes. That meant that every second wave was in phase with the bay, creating a seiche. As a result, Hilo suffered worse damage than any other place in Hawaii, with the combined tsunami and seiche reaching a height of  along the Bayfront, killing 96 people in the city alone. Seiche waves may continue for several days after a tsunami.

Tide-generated internal solitary waves (solitons) can excite coastal seiches at the following locations: Magueyes Island in Puerto Rico,
Puerto Princesa in Palawan Island,
Trincomalee Bay in Sri Lanka,
and in the Bay of Fundy in eastern Canada, where seiches cause some of the highest recorded tidal fluctuations in the world.
A dynamical mechanism exists for the generation of coastal seiches by deep-sea internal waves. These waves can generate a sufficient current at the shelf break to excite coastal seiches.

Underwater (internal) waves
Seiches are also observed beneath the surface of constrained bodies of water, acting along the thermocline.

In analogy with the Merian formula, the expected period of the internal wave can be expressed as:

        with       

where T is the natural period, L is the length of the water body,  the average thicknesses of the two layers separated by stratification (e.g. epilimnion and hypolimnion),  the densities of these two same layers and g the acceleration of gravity.

As the thermocline moves up and down a sloping lake bed, it creates a 'swash zone', where temperatures can vary rapidly, potentially affecting fish habitat. As the thermocline rises up a sloping lake bed, it can also cause benthic turbulence by convective overturning, whereas the falling thermocline experiences greater stratification and low turbulence at the lake bed.  Internal waves can also degenerate into non-linear internal waves on sloping lake-beds. When such non-linear waves break on the lake bed, they can be an important source of turbulence and have the potential for sediment resuspension

Cave seiches
Seiches were also observed in the cave after powerful earthquakes in 2012, 2018 and 2019.

Engineering for seiche protection

Engineers consider seiche phenomena in the design of flood protection works (e.g., Saint Petersburg Dam), reservoirs  and dams (e.g., Grand Coulee Dam), potable water storage basins, harbours and even spent nuclear fuel storage basins.

See also

Notes

Further reading

External links

General
What is a seiche?
 Seiche. Encyclopædia Britannica. Retrieved January 24, 2004, from Encyclopædia Britannica Premium Service.
Seiche calculator
Bonanza for Lake Superior: Seiches Do More Than Move Water 
Great Lakes Storms Photo Gallery Seiches, Storm Surges, and Edge Waves from NOAA
 Shelf Response for an identical pair of incident KdV solitons
Relationship to aquatic "monsters"
The Unmuseum
"The Legend of the Lake Champlain Monster" in The Skeptical Inquirer
Geological page

Limnology
Flood
Water waves
Water